Gumpel or Gumbel is a Germanic surname that may refer to 
Emil Julius Gumbel (1891–1966), German mathematician and political writer
Peter Gumpel (1923–2022), German Roman Catholic Jesuit priest and Church historian
Max Gumpel (1890–1965), Swedish building contractor and Olympic water polo player